Tropical Soul (Spanish:Almas tropicales) is a 1924 Mexican silent film directed by Miguel Contreras Torres and Manuel R. Ojeda.

Cast
 Miguel Contreras Torres 
 María Cozzi 
 Víctor Herrera
 Miguel Marques
 Alberto Miquel 
 Manuel R. Ojeda
 Ignacio Rosas 
 Rafael Vera de Córdova 
 Gobbie West

References

Bibliography
 Federico Dávalos Orozco & Esperanza Vázquez Bernal. Filmografía General Del Cine Mexicano, 1906-1931. Universidad Autónoma de Puebla, 1985.

External links 
 

1924 films
Mexican silent films
1920s Spanish-language films
Films directed by Manuel R. Ojeda
Mexican black-and-white films